The Palaruvi Express (Train number: 16791/16792) is a daily Intercity express train which runs between  in Tamil Nadu and  in Kerala. The train first introduced as a service running between Punalur in Kollam to Palakkad.

Background
The train was introduced on 19 April 2017, providing better connectivity to the Eastern Kollam region with Central Kerala and as a relief for daily commuters, especially office-goers who have been relying on Venad Express.

On 29 May 2022 it became the First train to pass through the Doubled track between Ettumanoor-Kottayam-Chingavanam section which made the Thiruvananthapuram-Kottayam-Eranakulam-Mangaluru section completely doubled electrified line.

Route
The service runs from (16791) every night and reaches  the following afternoon. On the return journey, the train leaves every evening, traverses the same route and reaches , next morning.

Coach Composition 
The train has 14 coaches comprising 4 Sleeper Coaches, 8 unreserved general coaches and 2 Luggage Rakes.

Since its introduction in April 2017, the train was running without even a single reservation compartment till September 2019. The train started its first run with 3 reservation sleeper compartments on 28 September 2019. At tirunelveli the train departure in 11.20 pm so few passenger only use this train from tirunelveli to kollam route vise visa because it's overnight train.

See also

 Venad Express
 Kollam–Thiruvananthapuram trunk line
 Kollam–Sengottai branch line
 Shoranur–Cochin Harbour section

Notes

References

External links

Named passenger trains of India
Rail transport in Kerala
Rail transport in Kollam
Railway services introduced in 2017
Express trains in India